Tikhon Viktorovich Dzyadko (born June 23, 1987) is a Russian journalist, television presenter and media manager. He is the editor-in-chief of the Dozhd TV channel, former deputy editor-in-chief and host of the RTVI TV network. He previously worked at the radio station Echo of Moscow and the Ukrainian channel Inter.

Education 
Dzyadko studied at the Russian State University for the Humanities at the Faculty of Philology.

Career 
He worked at the portal . From 2007 to 2012 he worked as a correspondent in Russia for the international organisation Reporters Without Borders.

Since May 24, 2011, on the same TV channel he has hosted the weekly Hard Day's Night programme. In 2012, Tikhon was nominated for the Made in Russia award for the programme.

In March 2014, he signed an appeal against the annexation of Crimea by the Russian Federation. Participant of the Congress "Ukraine – Russia: Dialogue", held on April 24–25, 2014 in Kyiv.

In August 2015, he left Dozhd to start working on the TV channel Inter in Washington, D.C. He started working as a news anchor on RTVI in 2016. From January 2018 to December 2019 he was Deputy Editor-in-Chief of the TV channel.

In December 2019, Dzyadko became the chief editor of Dozhd, replacing Alexandra Perepelova in this position.

Family 
Tikhon's father, Dzyadko Viktor Mikhailovich (1955—2020), was a programmer, Soviet human rights activist and artist. His mother  is a journalist and human rights activist. He has two brothers, Philipp and Timofey.

Dzyadko is married to journalist Ekaterina Kotrikadze.

References 

1987 births
Living people
21st-century Russian journalists
TV Rain
Echo of Moscow radio presenters
RTVI
Russian State University for the Humanities alumni
Media executives
Russian editors
Russian male journalists
Russian radio personalities
Russian television presenters